Mala Brda is a small settlement west of Postojna, just off the road towards Razdrto, in the Inner Carniola region of Slovenia.

References

External links

Mala Brda on Geopedia

Populated places in the Municipality of Postojna